Victoria Temple-Murray, (born 30 July 1994 in Exeter) is a professional squash player who represents England. She reached a career-high world ranking of World No. 67 in December 2014.

References

External links 

English female squash players
Living people
1994 births
Sportspeople from Exeter